The Gordon Montador Award was a Canadian literary award, presented by the Writers' Trust of Canada to honour non-fiction writing on social issues. Created in 1991 in memory of book editor and publisher Gordon Montador, the award was presented until 1999, when it was superseded by a reorganization of the Writers' Trust Awards. The Shaughnessy Cohen Prize for Political Writing, presented for the first time in 2000, encompassed much of the same subject area; although the Cohen award was never formally stated by the organization to be an official replacement for the Montador award, no new winner was ever announced for the Montador award after the Cohen award was introduced.

Winners and nominees

References

Canadian non-fiction literary awards
Writers' Trust of Canada awards
Awards established in 1991
Awards disestablished in 2000